Simit is a circular bread, typically encrusted with sesame seeds or, less commonly, poppy, flax or sunflower seeds, found across the cuisines of the former Ottoman Empire, and the Middle East. Simit's size, crunch, chewiness, and other characteristics vary slightly by region. It is widely known as Turkish bagel in the United States.

In İzmir, simit is known as gevrek ("crisp"), although it is very similar to the Istanbul variety. Simit in Ankara are smaller and crisper than those of other cities.

Name

The word simit comes from Arabic samīd "white bread" or "fine flour".

Other names are based on the Byzantine Greek kollikion (κολλῑ́κῐον): Ancient Greek kollyra (κολλύρα): Greek koulouri (κουλούρι). Aramaic ܩܶܠܽܘܪܳܐ/ܩܸܠܘܿܪܵܐ (qeluro/qelora); or the Turkish gevrek: South Slavic đevrek, ђеврек, gjevrek, ѓеврек, геврек. The Armenian name is բոկեղ (bokegh). In Judaeo-Spanish it is known as roskas turkas.

Origins
Archival sources show that simit has been produced in Istanbul since 1525. Based on Üsküdar court records (Şer’iyye Sicili) dated 1593, the weight and price of simit was standardized for the first time. The 17th-century traveler Evliya Çelebi wrote that there were 70 simit bakeries in Istanbul during the 1630s. Jean Brindesi's early 19th-century oil paintings about Istanbul daily life show simit sellers on the streets. Warwick Goble, too, made an illustration of these simit sellers of Istanbul in 1906. Simit and its variants became popular across the Ottoman Empire.

Consumption

Simit is generally served plain, or for breakfast with tea, fruit preserves, or cheese or ayran. Drinking tea with simit is traditional. Simit ("Bokegh" in Armenian) is a traditional Christmas bread in Armenia.

Simit are sold by street vendors in Turkey, who either have a simit trolley or carry the simit in a tray on their head.  Street merchants generally advertise simit as fresh ("Taze simit!"/"Taze gevrek!") since they are baked throughout the day; otherwise hot ("Sıcak, sıcak!") and extremely hot ("El yakıyor!" means "It burns the hand!") when they are not long out of the oven.

Simit is an important symbol for lower and middle-class people of Turkey. Sometimes it is called susam kebabı ("sesame kebab").

In other parts of the Middle East, it is consumed with boiled eggs and/or duggah, which is a mixture of herbs used as condiments. It is commonly used to break the fast, with yoghurt or buttermilk, in mosques in Mecca and Medina.

Today, many municipalities in Turkey produce simit through their own subsidiaries.

Similar products
Certain varieties of Romanian covrigi are similar to simit, the places that sell them even being known as "Simigerii".

Another type of bread similar to simit is known as obwarzanek (in particular obwarzanek krakowski) in Poland and bublik in Russia, Ukraine and Belarus. The main difference is that the rings of dough are poached briefly in boiling water prior to baking (similarly to bagels), instead of being dipped in water and molasses syrup, as is the case with simit.

Girde (Uygur: Гирде), is a type of bread baked on the walls of tandoori oven, that is very similar to simit, and that the Uyghurs  in China see as a characteristic item in their culture-specific kitchen.

See also

Bagel
Kandil simidi
Ka'ak
Obwarzanek
Rosca

References

Sesame seed breads
Street food in Turkey
Turkish breads
Turkish tea culture
Middle Eastern cuisine
Armenian cuisine